Bektaş Demirel (born February 8, 1976 as Visita Asanov in the Soviet Union) is a Turkish judoka. He competed at the 1996 Summer Olympics and the 2004 Summer Olympics.

Achievements

References

External links
 
 

1976 births
Living people
Turkish male judoka
Judoka at the 1996 Summer Olympics
Judoka at the 2004 Summer Olympics
Olympic judoka of Turkey
European champions for Turkey
Mediterranean Games bronze medalists for Turkey
Competitors at the 2005 Mediterranean Games
Mediterranean Games medalists in judo
20th-century Turkish people
21st-century Turkish people